There were two American Jewish organizations colloquially known as the Farband: the Communist-oriented Yidisher Kultur Farband (Jewish Culture Association) and the Labor Zionist-oriented Yidish Natsionaler Arbeter Farband (Jewish National Workers Alliance).

Yidisher Kultur Farband

YKUF / Jewish Culture Association /  

The Yidisher kultur-farband (YKUF, rarely called by its English [translated] name, the Jewish Culture Association) was a U.S. association, initially Communist-oriented, formed for preserving and developing Yiddish culture in Yiddish and in English, through an art section, a writers' group, reading circles, and publications. YKUF was founded in Paris in September 1937 by Jewish Communists and their supporters as an international body to disseminate ideology to the Yiddish-reading and Yiddish-speaking community.
 
The organizing meeting was an international congress of Yiddish culture, the first to be held since the 1908 Czernowitz Conference for the Yiddish Language; about 100 delegates attended, including 11 from the United States. The first chairman of YKUF was the non-Communist writer Alexander Mukdoni; the secretary (to 1957) was the poet Zishe Weinper, an efficient fundraiser for YKUF and, according to Melech Epstein, a "secret member of the Communist Party." In the U.S., financial support also came from the Jewish People's Fraternal Order, the Jewish section of the International Workers Order. At the time of the non-aggression pact between Joseph Stalin and Adolf Hitler in August 1939, many of the non-Communist artists and writers affiliated with YKUF left the organization. 
 
Branches of the international YKUF were established in various countries. The U.S. branch, founded in 1937, ceased operation soon after the death of Itche Goldberg on December 27, 2006.  

Prominent cultural figures, such as Kalman Marmor and Nachman Meisel, saw to it that Farlag YKUF, the organization’s New York-based publishing house, issued highly regarded anthologies and studies of Yiddish literature. It published more than 250 books, including Yiddish fiction and poetry, memoirs (by Reuben Brainin, among others), history, and anthologies such as America in Yiddish Literature (1961). The U.S. YKUF began publishing the journal Yidishe Kultur in 1938, initially a monthly, in recent decades it appeared bimonthly or seven times a year. Meisel, who was not a Communist Party member and had edited a Polish literary magazine, became its first editor; in 1964, he was succeeded by Itche Goldberg, who edited it since that time to 2004. With Goldberg's death, the magazine ceased publication.
 
The political roots of YKUF were more of historical note than ideological tendency in its last decades. In the mid-1990s, contact and rapprochement developed between YKUF and its historically socialist counterpart organization, the Congress for Jewish Culture, also based in New York, as well as the Congress’s publication, Zukunft ("Future"). They subsequently cooperated in such activities as commemorations of the Warsaw Ghetto Uprising, and memorials for the Soviet-Yiddish writers murdered in August 1952 in Moscow 's Lubyanka prison.

Yidish Natsionaler Arbeter Farband

Jewish National Workers Alliance /  

The Yidish Natsionaler Arbeter Farband or Jewish National Workers Alliance (NJWA) was an early Yiddish-speaking Labor Zionist landsmanshaft in North America, founded in 1912. Its official organ was the Yidishe Kempfer or Jewish Fighter, edited by Baruch Zuckerman. The Farband operated as a mutual aid society parallel to the political party Poale Zion, organizing cooperative insurance and medical plans and an extensive Yiddish and Hebrew educational system, as well as having developed in the 1920s a cooperative housing building in the Bronx, New York.  The Farband even developed and maintained cemeteries for movement members. While mainly based in New York, the Farband was active throughout the United States and Canada, forming local chapters and summer camps in many cities with significant Jewish communities.  The summer camp for the New York chapter was called Camp Kinderwelt, located in Upstate New York, and had an adjoining adults camp called Unser Camp. The Farband ran a network of secular schools in the US and Canada, called Folkshulen. In 1931 the Farband Yugnt Clubs, their youth wing, joined with Young Poale Zion to form the Young Poale Zion Alliance as the official youth wing of the entire Labor Zionist movement in America. 

The Los Angeles branch published Chaim Grade, including the Yiddish originals of The Agunah and The Yeshiva.

In 1971, the Farband joined with Poale Zion, the Labor Zionist Organization of America, and the American Habonim Association to form the Labor Zionist Alliance, which in 2004 re-branded and renamed itself as Ameinu.

See also

 The Workmen's Circle/Arbeter Ring
 International Workers Order
 Habonim Dror

References

External links
 "Farband" in JewishVirtualLibrary 
 "First Steps (1911-1929)" by Moshe Cohen in Arise and Build: The Story of American Habonim
 Jew vs. Jew: The Struggle for the Soul of American Jewry by  Samuel G. Freedman.
 Museum of the City of New York''
 The Labor Zionist Alliance in Canada

Zionist organizations
Jewish socialism
Jewish community organizations
Jewish clubs and societies
Insurance companies of the United States
Jewish educational organizations
Jews and Judaism in New York City
Yiddish culture in New York City
Companies based in New York City

Ethnic fraternal orders in the United States
Labor Zionism
Zionism in the United States
Socialist organizations in the United States
Organizations established in 1937
Organizations established in 1912
1937 establishments in the United States
1912 establishments in the United States